Vertigo angustior, the narrow-mouthed whorl snail, is a species of minute land snail, a terrestrial pulmonate gastropod mollusk or micromollusk in the family Vertiginidae, the whorl snails. 

Subspecies
 † Vertigo angustior intermedia Schlickum & Strauch, 1979

Description
The shell measures 1.6 to 2.0 mm (mean: 1.8 mm) in height and 0.9 1.05 mm (mean: 1 mm) in width. It is oblong ovoid with 4.5 to 5.35 whorls (mean 5). The aperture is sinistral and relatively small. The aperture edge is bent (indented) and slightly thickened and the aperture is slightly notched, the notch continuing outside as a spiral groove. The aperture bears 5-6 mainly short denticles: 2 parietal; 2 columellar; 1 palatal, the latter relatively long. The shell is brown to yellowish brown or horn coloured and has a fine growth striation.

Distribution 
 IUCN red list - conservation dependent
 It is mentioned in Annex II of the European Union's Habitats Directive.

The species occurs in many countries in Europe and in Asia:

Western Europe:
 Great Britain in List of endangered species in the British Isles (Ireland, United Kingdom). Endangered in Great Britain.
 Ireland Conservation status: Vulnerable (VU)
 Belgium
 France
 Liechtenstein
 Netherlands
 Switzerland

Central Europe:
 Austria
 Czech Republic - vulnerable (VU). Its conservation status in the Czech Republic in 2004-2006 is bad (U2) in pannonian area and favourable (FV) in continental area in report for European commission in accordance with Habitats Directive.
 Germany
 Hungary
 Poland - endangered
 Slovakia
 Slovenia

Northern Europe: Denmark, Finland, Norway, Sweden

Eastern Europe: Belarus, Estonia, Latvia, Lithuania, Russian Federation, Ukraine

Southern Europe: Italy, Romania

Asia: Armenia, Azerbaijan, Georgia.

References

Further reading 
 Zofia Książkiewicz. January 2008. The narrow-mouthed whorl snail Vertigo angustior (Pulmonata: Gastropoda: Vertiginidae) - distribution and habitat disturbance in northwestern Poland. 
 Provoost, S.; Bonte, D. (Ed.) (2004). Animated dunes: a view of biodiversity at the Flemish coast [Levende duinen: een overzicht van de biodiversiteit aan de Vlaamse kust]. Mededelingen van het Instituut voor Natuurbehoud, 22. Instituut voor Natuurbehoud: Brussel, Belgium. ISBN 90-403-0205-7. 416, ill., appendices pp. Tentacle 16. 5-6.
 The narrow-mouthed whorl snail (Vertigo angustior) (1014) Conservation Status Assessment Report.
 Sysoev, A. V. & Schileyko, A. A. (2009). Land snails and slugs of Russia and adjacent countries. Sofia/Moskva (Pensoft). 312 pp., 142 plates.

External links
 Jeffreys, J. G. (1830). A synopsis of the testaceous pneumonobranchous Mollusca of Great Britain. Transactions of the Linnean Society of London. 16: 323-392
 Müller, A. (1838). Ueber einige vaterländische Landschnecken. Archiv für Naturgeschichte. 4, 1: 209-211, pl. 4. Berlin
 Michaud, A.-L.-G. (1831). Complément de l'Histoire des mollusques terrestres et fluviatiles de la France, de J.P.R. Draparnaud. i-xvi, 1-116, Errata (1 p.), 1-12, pls 14-16. (December). Verdun: Lippmann
 Schileyko, A. A. & Rymzhanov, T. S. (2013). Fauna of land mollusks (Gastropoda, Pulmonata Terrestria) of Kazakhstan and adjacent territories. Moscow-Almaty: KMK Scientific Press. 389 pp
 Vertigo angustior at Animalbase taxonomy,short description, distribution, biology,status (threats), images
 photo of Vertigo angustior
 https://web.archive.org/web/20081108053410/http://www.staff.amu.edu.pl/~polmal/smp/v115.htm
 MNHN, Paris: specimen

angustior
Gastropods described in 1830
Taxa named by John Gwyn Jeffreys